The Chilean presidential primaries of 2021 were held in Chile on Sunday 18 July 2021. According to the law, primaries are voluntary, but its results are binding. Two political coalitions decided to participate: Former minister Sebastián Sichel won the Chile Vamos primary with 49% of the vote, while deputy Gabriel Boric became the Apruebo Dignidad nominee with 60%.

The Constituent Unity coalition decided not to participate. The presidential election was held on Sunday 21 November 2021.

Primary results

Source: Tricel.

References

2021 in Chile
Primary elections in Chile